Llanada Alavesa is one of the seven comarcas in Álava, consisting of eight municipalities. Its administrative center and largest municipality is Agurain/Salvatierra.

Municipalities

References

External links
 

Comarcas of Álava